The bronze sculpture of Canadian physician John Sebastian Helmcken was installed outside the Helmcken House, in Victoria, British Columbia, in 2011. The statue was designed and created by artist Armando Barbon, and cost $180,000.

The sculpture's plaque has the following inscription: "Dr Helmcken earned acclaim for his work as a physician, colonial legislator and negotiator of British Columbia’s entry into Canada. This statue, created by Armando Barbon and Gabriele Vicari, was donated to the Royal BC Museum by the family of Yole and Armando Barbon. May 19, 2011"

See also
 2011 in art

References

External links
 

2011 establishments in British Columbia
2011 sculptures
Bronze sculptures in British Columbia
Outdoor sculptures in Victoria, British Columbia
Sculptures of men in Canada
Statues in Canada